William Charles "Bill" Corbett was the 11th Clerk of the House of Commons of Canada, having served from 2000 to 2005.

Clerks of the House of Commons (Canada)
1944 births
2010 deaths